Lewistown Heights is an unincorporated area and census-designated place (CDP) in Fergus County, Montana, United States. The population was 407 at the 2010 census, up from 365 in 2000.

Geography
Lewistown Heights is located at  (47.075668, -109.455739), northwest of Lewistown, the county seat. It is bordered to the south by Valach Road, to the east by Joyland Road, to the north by Wolverine Creek Road, and to the west by Wolverine Creek.

Demographics

As of the census of 2000, there were 365 people, 138 households, and 93 families residing in the CDP. The population density was 155.6 people per square mile (60.0/km2). There were 149 housing units at an average density of 63.5/sq mi (24.5/km2). The racial makeup of the CDP was 94.52% White, 1.64% African American, 1.37% Native American, 1.64% from other races, and 0.82% from two or more races. Hispanic or Latino of any race were 1.64% of the population.

There were 138 households, out of which 32.6% had children under the age of 18 living with them, 57.2% were married couples living together, 5.8% had a female householder with no husband present, and 31.9% were non-families. 18.8% of all households were made up of individuals, and 8.7% had someone living alone who was 65 years of age or older. The average household size was 2.64 and the average family size was 3.13.

In the CDP, the population was spread out, with 29.0% under the age of 18, 6.0% from 18 to 24, 28.8% from 25 to 44, 24.7% from 45 to 64, and 11.5% who were 65 years of age or older. The median age was 37 years. For every 100 females, there were 92.1 males. For every 100 females age 18 and over, there were 107.2 males.

The median income for a household in the CDP was $31,154, and the median income for a family was $34,063. Males had a median income of $28,382 versus $13,036 for females. The per capita income for the CDP was $11,274. About 9.3% of families and 15.6% of the population were below the poverty line, including 12.7% of those under age 18 and none of those age 65 or over.

References

Census-designated places in Fergus County, Montana
Census-designated places in Montana